The University of Canberra (UC) is a public research university with its main campus located in Bruce, Canberra, Australian Capital Territory. UC offers undergraduate and postgraduate courses covering five faculties: Health, Art and Design, Business, Government and Law, Education, and Science and Technology.

UC partners with two local ACT schools: UC Senior Secondary College Lake Ginninderra and University of Canberra High School Kaleen. The University of Canberra College provides pathways into university for domestic and international students.

History
The University of Canberra was first established in 1967 as the Canberra College of Advanced Education. The Canberra CAE became the University of Canberra under sponsorship of Monash University in 1990. 

Over 70,000 students have graduated from the university since 1970.

The University of Canberra has grown by 78% since 2007, going from 7,300 students to over 13,000 in 2014. The median Australian Tertiary Admission Rank of UC students is approximately 71.

Foundation stone and Stone Day 

At the end of the year after classes finish but before exams, Stone Day was once held, a music festival with local bands, which lasted several days. The day before it was known as Stone Eve. It started as a celebration held annually to mark the placing of the foundation stone by Prime Minister John Gorton on 28 October 1968.
The stone is displayed near Building 1 at the university, and an inscription on it reads:

Over the years the Stone Day program gradually became larger and larger, eventually encompassing an entire week and transforming into one of Australia's most popular music festivals. The first foundation celebrations were held in 1971. In 1973 Stone Day celebrations were held over two days, which was expanded to take up a whole week in 1976. In the 1980s and 1990s, Stoneweek became a popular Canberra entertainment event, which in 2000 became Stonefest. Beginning in 2012, the Stonefest event was not held for a number of years at the University of Canberra. In 2014, the university decided to create a 'Stonefest' mini music festival where there was a DJ and numerous activities. It was not received well, and has not been held since. In June 2019 the University of Canberra announced that Stonefest would return in October in an expanded format, with both local and international acts performing.

Campus 

The university has one campus, located in the suburb of Bruce, which covers 290 acres of buildings, roads and access routes. There are just over 28 buildings, each dedicated to a particular discipline of learning or faculty. Most of these buildings are arranged around the main concourse. Each building is numbered and many do not hold any title or namesake. New students are advised during orientation that the buildings are not numbered in a particular order, however the buildings around the concourse are progressively numbered in a counter-clockwise direction from building 1. It is a common myth that the numbers relate to when each building was constructed, however, a master plan was designed to have these building around the concourse numbered this way.

Library

The University of Canberra Library is located in Building 8. The building has four floors.

Facilities
The Refectory is the main food hall located in Building 1, operated by the UC Union. It provides cafes, post office, general shop, pool tables, and lounges, and is also concert venue. Upstairs there are study rooms which can be booked by students and staff.

The Hub is located under the main concourse, providing cafes, a hairdressing salon, and a branch of the Commonwealth Bank of Australia. The University of Canberra's student radio station 87.8 UCFM studios are also located in The Hub. The UC HUB also hosts DJs.

A sport and fitness centre is located in Building 29 with gym facilities and is home to Brumbies Rugby administration. There are basketball and squash courts nearby in Building 4, and various sporting ovals available.

Student accommodation
There are three accommodation options for students - UniLodge (consisting of Cooper Lodge, Weeden Lodge and more recently UC Lodge, all run by UniLodge Australia Pty Ltd), Campus West (run by UniLodge) and University Gardens (located in neighbor suburb of Belconnen, run by UniGardens Pty). All options are provided to all students, including international students.

Organisation and administration

Administration
The current Chancellor of the university since 1 January 2014 is Tom Calma, an Australian Aboriginal elder of the Kungarakan people, and a human rights and social justice campaigner.

The current Vice-Chancellor of the university since 6 April 2020 is Professor Paddy Nixon, a technologist and computer scientist. The former Vice-Chancellor from 1 September 2016 to 21 December 2019 was Professor Deep Saini, a plant physiologist.

Like most Australian universities, University of Canberra derives the majority of its revenue from Australian Government funding and student fees. The ACT Government provides around one percent of the university's operating budget.

Faculties
The five faculties are:

Arts and Design
Arts and design specialises in Architecture, Landscape Architecture, Graphic Design, Communication Studies, Culture and Heritage, Journalism, Creative Writing and Poetry, International Studies, and Media Arts. The faculty has two schools: School of Design and the Built Environment and School of Arts and Communication.

Business, Government and Law
The Business Government and Law Faculty provides courses in Accounting, Applied Economics, Business Administration, Business Informatics, Construction, Economics, Finance, Law, Management, Marketing, Politics, Sociology, Public Policy, Tourism, and Urban and Regional Planning.

 Education
The Education faculty offers courses designed to cover all stages of teacher development with courses in early childhood, primary and secondary.

Health
The Faculty of Health prepares allied health professionals, including nurses, midwives, occupational therapists, optometrists & vision scientists, psychologists, physiotherapists, pharmacists, dietitians, nutritionists, radiologists, speech pathologists, exercise scientists, and sports management professionals.

Science and Technology 
The Faculty of Science and Technology trains students in Environmental Sciences, Biomedical and Forensic as well as Information Technology, Information Systems, Engineering, and Mathematics.

UC also offers a range of double degrees that combine two degrees from different faculties.

Academic profile

Rankings

The university is named among the world's top 20 young universities in the 2020 Times Higher Education (THE) Young University Rankings. 
The university has risen to number 18 from number 34 in the latest THE's list of the best universities under 50 years of age.

Research centres
The university has a number of research centres relating to its areas of research strength. These are:

 Institute for Applied Ecology
 Institute for Governance and Policy Analysis
 Research Institute for Sport and Exercise
 Health Research Institute
 Centre for Creative and Cultural Research
 News and Media Research Centre
 Centre for Research and Action in Public Health
 Centre for Research in Therapeutic Solutions
 STEM Education Research Centre
 SYNERGY Nursing and Midwifery Research Centre
 Nexus Research Centre
 Canberra Urban and Regional Futures
 Collaborative Indigenous Research Initiative
 Murray-Darling Basin Futures Collaborative Research Network
 Invasive Animals Cooperative Research Centre

Notable people

Staff
Notable staff members include/have included:
 Janine Deakin, geneticist
 John Dryzek, political scientist
 Patricia Easteal, Professor of Law
 Donald Horne, journalist, writer, social critic, historian and public intellectual
 Peter Leahy, former Chief of Army (Australia)
 Ingrid Moses, Emeritus Professor and a former Chancellor
 Susan Ryan, one-time Labor government Minister

Alumni

See also

 List of universities in Australia
 University of Canberra (Wikiversity)
 University of Canberra Vikings

References

Bibliography

 
 
 
 

 
Universities in the Australian Capital Territory
Educational institutions established in 1967
Articles containing video clips
1967 establishments in Australia